The Chief Justice of Sudan is the head of the Judiciary of Sudan. Under Article 29.(3) of the August 2019 Draft Constitutional Declaration, the Chief Justice is also the President of the Supreme Court of Sudan and is "responsible for administering the judicial authority before the Supreme Judicial Council."

Nemat Abdullah Khair, the current Chief Justice, was claimed by Sudan Daily and Khartoum Star as being appointed as the first female Chief Justice of Sudan in late August 2019. On 12 September 2019, two thousand protestors called for Abdelgadir Mohamed Ahmed to be appointed Chief Justice instead. Khair was formally appointed as Chief Justice of Sudan by decree on 10 October 2019.

List of Chief Justices

See also
History of Sudan

References

Lists of judges